The following bridges are named the Third Avenue Bridge:
Third Avenue Bridge (New York City)
Third Avenue Bridge (Minneapolis)
Third Avenue Bridge (Fort Lauderdale)